The 2009 European Parliament election was the United Kingdom's component of the 2009 European Parliament election, the voting for which was held on Thursday 4 June 2009. The election was held concurrently with the 2009 local elections in England. In total, 72 Members of the European Parliament were elected from the United Kingdom using proportional representation.

Notable outcomes were that the Labour Party – which came third – suffered a significant drop in support, and that the UK Independence Party (UKIP) finished second in a major election for the first time in its history, coming level with Labour in terms of seats but ahead of it in terms of votes. This was the first time in British electoral history that a party in government had been outpolled in a national election by a party with no representation in the House of Commons. The British National Party (BNP) also won two seats, its first ever in a nationwide election. It also marked the first time the Scottish National Party (SNP) won the largest share of the European election vote in Scotland, and the first time Labour had failed to come first in a Welsh election since 1918. It was the Democratic Unionist Party (DUP)'s worst ever European election result, and also the first time an Irish Republican party, Sinn Féin, topped the polls in Northern Ireland.

Background

Electoral system
The United Kingdom elected 72 Members of the European Parliament using proportional representation. It was divided into twelve multi-member constituencies, or regions. The eleven of these regions which form Great Britain used a closed-list party list system method of proportional representation, calculated using the D'Hondt method. Northern Ireland used the single transferable vote (STV).

The experimental use of all-postal ballots in four regions in 2004 was not repeated, resulting in a sharp reduction in turnout in those regions.

Constituencies and representation
As had been the case since 1999, the electoral constituencies were based on the government's nine English regions, Scotland, Northern Ireland and Wales, creating a total of 12 constituencies. The Treaty of Nice fixed the number of MEPs for the whole European Parliament at 736; as a consequence of the accession of Romania and Bulgaria in 2007, the number of seats allocated to the United Kingdom was reduced from 78 to 72. If the Treaty of Lisbon had entered into force by June 2009, this figure would have been 73.

On 31 July 2007, in line with the required reduction in representation from the United Kingdom, the number of members elected from each region was modified by the Boundary Commission and Electoral Commission, based on the size of the electorate in each region. The recommended changes were approved by the Parliament of the United Kingdom in 2008.

Changes in regional seat allocations

1Includes Gibraltar, the only British overseas territory which was then part of the EU.

MEPs retiring
Conservative
Christopher Beazley (East of England)
John Bowis (London)
Philip Bushill-Matthews (West Midlands)
Jonathan Evans (Wales) – Became MP for Cardiff North in 2010
Chris Heaton-Harris (East Midlands) – Became MP for Daventry in 2010
Caroline Jackson (South West England)
Neil Parish (South West England) – Became MP for Tiverton and Honiton in 2010
John Purvis (Scotland)
David Sumberg (North West England)

Labour
Robert Evans (London)
Glenys Kinnock (Wales)
Eluned Morgan (Wales)
Gary Titley (North West England)

UKIP
Jeffrey Titford (East of England)
John Whittaker (North West England)
Roger Knapman (South West England)

Liberal Democrat
Elspeth Attwooll (Scotland)
Emma Nicholson (South East England)

Independents
Den Dover (North West England) – former Conservative MEP, expelled over his expenses.
Robert Kilroy-Silk (East Midlands) – former UKIP MEP, created new party Veritas.
Ashley Mote (South East England) – former UKIP MEP, expelled for expenses fraud for which he was later jailed.
Tom Wise (East of England) – former UKIP MEP, expelled for expenses fraud for which he was later jailed.

Opinion polls
In the run up to the election, several polling organisations carried out public opinion polling in regards to voting intentions in Great Britain. Results of such polls are displayed below.

ComRes, ICM, Populus and YouGov are members of the British Polling Council, and abide by its disclosure rules. BPIX is not a member of the BPC, and does not publish detailed methodology and findings.

Results

United Kingdom

Great Britain

Turnout in Great Britain was 34.3%, with 15,137,202 votes out of a total electorate of 44,171,778. Most of the results of the election were announced on Sunday 7 June, after similar elections were held in the other 26 member states of the European Union. Scotland declared its result on Monday 8 June, as counting in the Western Isles was delayed due to observance of the Sabbath.

Great Britain kept to the Europe-wide trend towards the right. The Labour Party, which was in its twelfth year of government of the United Kingdom, polled third and suffered a significant drop in support; UKIP finished second in a major election for the first time in its history, coming level with Labour in terms of seats but ahead of it in terms of votes. This was the first time in British electoral history that a party in government had been outpolled in a national election by a party with no representation in the House of Commons.

The Conservatives won in every region in Great Britain except the North East, where Labour won, and Scotland, where the SNP won. Labour suffered most notably in Cornwall, where it came sixth behind Mebyon Kernow, and in the wider South West region and South East, where it polled fifth behind the Green Party. The British National Party won two seats, its first ever in a national election. The share of the vote achieved by the English Democrats doubled.

The turnout in Scotland was the lowest in the United Kingdom at 28.8%, with 1,104,512 votes out of a total electorate of 3,872,975. In Scotland it was the first time the SNP won the largest share of the European election vote. The SNP share of the vote rose by 9.4% points compared to 2004; this was the biggest positive swing for any party in any region in Great Britain.

In Wales it was the first time since 1918 that Labour had failed to come first in a Welsh election, dropping 12.2%. In Wales the Conservative Party topped the poll, with the nationalist Plaid Cymru coming a close third. UKIP took the fourth Welsh seat, the first time Wales had elected a UKIP MEP. Both the Liberal Democrats and the Green Party polled their lowest regional shares in Wales, though
Wales was the only region where the Liberal Democrat share of the vote rose compared with 2004.

Summary of the election results for Great Britain

†Seat change has been adjusted to allow for direct comparison with the results from the 2004 election

1Joint ticket, ran in England as: The Christian Party - Christian Peoples Alliance.

Gibraltar

Gibraltar is a British overseas territory (BOT) and therefore is under the jurisdiction and sovereignty of the United Kingdom but does not form part of it. Gibraltar was, however, part of the EU, the only BOT to be so, and participated as part of the South West England constituency.

Turnout was 35% in Gibraltar, below the 39% for the South West England electoral region as a whole and significantly lower than the turnout in Gibraltar in 2004.

The Conservatives won with 53.3% of the votes. Labour narrowly retained second place achieving 19% to the Liberal Democrats' 18.2%.

Northern Ireland

It was the DUP's worst ever European election result: the party had previously topped the poll in every European election in Northern Ireland since the first one in 1979. It was also the first time an Irish Republican topped the poll, Bairbre de Brún of Sinn Féin coming first with 125,000 votes. The share of the votes for most parties in Northern Ireland remained essentially unchanged, the main exceptions were the DUP where their share of the vote fell by 13.8%, and the TUV, a party created by former DUP MEP Jim Allister whose share of the vote rose 13.7%. The DUP's decreased vote share was largely blamed on the TUV splitting the vote.

Summary of the election results for Northern Ireland
{| class="wikitable"
|-
! colspan="2" rowspan="2" | Party
! rowspan="2" | Candidate
! rowspan="2" | Seats
! rowspan="2" | Loss/GainFirst Preference Votes
|-
! Number
! % of vote
|- style="text-align:right;font-weight: bold;"
| 
| Bairbre de Brún || 1 || 0 || 126,184 ||25.8
|- style="text-align:right;font-weight: bold;"
| 
| Diane Dodds || 1 || 0 || 88,346 ||18.1
|- style="text-align:right;font-weight: bold;"
| 
| Jim Nicholson || 1 || 0 || 82,892 ||17.0
|- style="text-align:right;"
| 
| Alban Maginness || 0 || 0 || 78,489 ||16.1
|- style="text-align:right;"
| 
| Jim Allister || 0 || 0 || 66,197 ||13.5
|- style="text-align:right;"
| 
| Ian Parsley || 0 || 0 || 26,699 ||5.5
|- style="text-align:right;"
| 
| Steven Agnew || 0 || 0 || 15,764 ||3.2
|- style="text-align:right;"
|colspan=5|Turnout||488,891 ||42.8
|}

Incumbents defeated
Labour
Glyn Ford (South West England)
Neena Gill (West Midlands)
Richard Corbett (Yorkshire and the Humber)

Traditional Unionist Voice
Jim Allister (Northern Ireland) – was elected in the 2004 election as a candidate for the DUP; subsequently in 2007 Allister resigned from the DUP and formed the TUV. In the 2009 election, Diane Dodds retook the seat for the DUP.

Aftermath
Gordon Brown faced calls for him to resign as Prime Minister following Labour's defeat.

During the 2005 Conservative leadership election, David Cameron argued for withdrawal of the Conservatives from EPP-ED and for the formation of a new group. After the European election it was announced that the Conservatives were leaving the EPP-ED and forming a new group, the European Conservatives and Reformists. On 22 June 2009, the first official list of the new group's members was released. The group held its inaugural meeting on 24 June, during which Conservative MEP Timothy Kirkhope was named interim leader. The first election for the group leadership was also scheduled for 14 July, pitting interim leader Kirkhope against fellow Briton Geoffrey Van Orden. However, both Conservative leadership candidates were forced to forfeit the leadership in order to prevent the group from collapsing, when then-Conservative MEP Edward McMillan-Scott defied his party whip and stood for one of the vice-presidency posts despite pledges the previous week that Polish MEP Michał Kamiński would be backed for it. Kaminski's bid for Vice-President of the European Parliament subsequently failed, and the Poles threatened to abandon the new caucus unless Kaminski was made the group leader in the parliament.

Similarly, UKIP helped found a new European Parliament Group, Europe of Freedom and Democracy, after the other parties in UKIP's pre-election European parliamentary grouping, Independence/Democracy, had polled badly.

Because two BNP candidates were elected to the European Parliament at 2009 election, the UK Government announced that it would provide them both with only the bare minimum level of support, denying them the ready access to officials and information that the other 70 British MEPs received.
Summary of the post-election European Parliament Groupings of each party

See also
 2009 European Parliament election
 Members of the European Parliament for the United Kingdom 2009–2014 (alphabetic order)
 Treaty of Lisbon
 2009 United Kingdom local elections
 2010 United Kingdom general election
 Opinion polling for the 2010 United Kingdom general election

References

External links
BBC coverage
List of UK candidates for each region

United Kingdom
2009
2009 elections in the United Kingdom
June 2009 events in the United Kingdom